The Ketebo people are an ethnic group in South Sudan. The Ketebo are inhabitants of Bira which is the land of the Ketebo.  Bira which was a Ugandan Protectorate until 1925 and was transferred to Sudan’s administration in 1926. The Ketebo are sometimes referred to by the Didinga as "Loceha/Loceka". The Ketebo live in Bira, which is one of the Payams of Kidepo County, Torit, Eastern Equatoria State of South Sudan. They are one of the smallest and least known tribes in South Sudan. The Ketebo in Uganda are called Mening, which is also one of the smallest tribes in Uganda. The population of this ethnic group is over 45,000.  Bira is the land of the Ketebo which include; Lofus, Madial, Lorum, Lotome, Lojilingare, Arata, Nakoringole, Lonyili, Kamulach, Tulel, Ofi, Natedo, Nahitahapel (Ihapelmoru), Naurkori, Lochorangichokio, Lokudul, Napeyase, Ogeng, Tongoborei, Kalabe (Apoka), Irobi, Narus, Koryang, Tomoodo, Koryang, Losigiria, Irobi just to mention a few.  The Ketebo people are also found in Lotukei in Budi County.  

The Ketebo clans include the following: Akafuo, Amening (Ikuruha or Black Crow), Ametere, Fatuol, Ibilei, Icarai, Igago, Ikai (Lightening), Ikorom, Ingebe, Kitimo, Kurumo, Lohutok (white chest crow), Lokuti, Lonyili, Lomiru, Melong, Moliro (squerial), Ongeja, Omiro and Ngiriwo

Language
The Ketebo speak Oketeboi and Lokathan languages. The predominant language they speak today is Oketeboi with some mixture of Dongotono.

History
In Uganda, the Ketebo or Mening lived in the area of what is now Kidepo Valley National Park since 1800, but it was gazetted as a game reserve by the British colonial government in 1958. The purpose was both to protect the animals from hunting and to prevent further clearing of bush for tsetse fly-control. After the eviction of the resident people and the resultant famine, the Ketebo people were forcefully relocated to other areas within Bira such as Napotpot, Kalo Kudo, Namosingo, Loriwo and Naurkori in South Sudan. This is cited in contemporary park management as an example of the unacceptable consequences of not taking community needs into account when designating reserves.

Economic activities
The Ketebo people were previously pastoralist in nature but due to change in climate and external influence from the neighbouring communities they are now practicing cultivation systems, with sorghum, maize and sesame as the main crops during the growing season (April to August).

Bira is isolated and inaccessible.

References

Ethnic groups in South Sudan